Slice is a 2020 mixed media artwork mostly oil painting by the American Neo-Dada and Pop artist Jasper Johns with contributions from Margaret Geller and Jéan Marc Togodgue. 

It is a horizontal largely black oil painting that combines unrelated images of a map of outer space and a human knee respectively by the aforementioned collaborators Geller and Togodgue. The painting was shown publicly for the first time in September of 2021 at the Whitney Museum of American Art in the two museum retrospective of Johns' work "Mind/Mirror" held simultaneously at the Whitney and the Philadelphia Museum of Art. 

Much controversy has ensued over Johns' copying and subsequent usage of a self-styled version of an anatomical drawing of a knee by Togodgue without his knowledge. The artist only informed the young repatriated student basketball player from Cameroon after Slice was completed.  Johns had seen the drawing in his orthopedist's office which had been donated by the athlete as a thank you to the doctor for his surgery. In August of 2021, Johns and Togodgue ultimately reached an undisclosed settlement for a licensing agreement.

Prior to employment of the drawing of the knee he had received the image of the galaxy from astrophysicist Margaret Geller. 
The title Johns chose for the artwork originated with the scientist's unsolicited contribution which inspired the artist.

References

2020 paintings
Paintings by Jasper Johns
Space art